Nastassia Sahara Elizabeth Lindes (born 1992) is an English-American fashion model and musician. She is the face of YSL Beauty.

Early life 
Lindes was born in Westminster, London, England to rock musician Hal Lindes and model Mary Lovett. They moved to Los Angeles, California in 1998. She has an older brother named Misha, who is a musician, and younger sister named Evangeline, who is an actress.

Career 
Lindes was discovered at a bowling alley. She modeled for H&M, Vogue Japan, ASOS, Cosmopolitan, Jeremy Scott and Moschino, Seventeen, i-D, and appeared on the cover of Russh'' magazine.

After seeing her perform with her band The Paranoyds, fashion designer Hedi Slimane cast her for an Yves Saint Laurent show and campaign. She has appeared in ads for Rag & Bone, Forever 21, Mango, and Dior; she's appeared in editorials for American and Russian Vogue, W, and Harper's Bazaar. She has also walked the runway for Sonia Rykiel.

References

1993 births
Living people
American female models
English female models
People from Westminster
People from Los Angeles
Models from Los Angeles
Models from London
English people of American descent
American people of English descent
American women guitarists
Women bass guitarists
The Society Management models